Amherst is a town in Hampshire County, Massachusetts, United States, in the Connecticut River valley. As of the 2020 census, the population was 39,263, making it the highest populated municipality in Hampshire County (although the county seat is Northampton). The town is home to Amherst College, Hampshire College, and the University of Massachusetts Amherst, three of the Five Colleges. The name of the town is pronounced without the h ("AM-erst") by natives and long-time residents, giving rise to the local saying, "only the 'h' is silent", in reference both to the pronunciation and to the town's politically active populace.

Amherst has three census-designated places: Amherst Center, North Amherst, and South Amherst.

Amherst is part of the Springfield, Massachusetts Metropolitan Statistical Area. Amherst is also located in the Pioneer Valley, which encompasses Hampshire, Hampden and Franklin counties.

History

The earliest known document of the lands now comprising Amherst is the deed of purchase dated December 1658 between John Pynchon of Springfield and three native inhabitants, referred to as Umpanchla, Quonquont, and Chickwalopp. According to the deed, "ye Indians of Nolwotogg (Norwottuck) upon ye River of Quinecticott (Connecticut)" sold the entire area in exchange for "two Hundred fatham of Wampam & Twenty fatham, and one large Coate at Eight fatham wch Chickwollop set of, of trusts, besides severall small giftes" .

Amherst was first visited by Europeans no later than 1665, when Nathaniel Dickinson surveyed the lands for its mother town Hadley. The first permanent English settlements arrived in 1727.  It remained a part of Hadley, even when it gained precinct status in 1734, before becoming a township in 1759.

When it incorporated, the colonial governor assigned the town the name "Amherst" after Jeffery Amherst, 1st Baron Amherst. Many a colonial governor at the time scattered his name during the influx of new town applications, which is why several towns in the Northeast bear the name. Amherst was Commander-in-Chief of the forces of North America during the French and Indian War who, according to popular legend, singlehandedly won Canada for the British and banished France from North America. Popular belief has it that he supported the American side in the Revolutionary War and resigned his commission rather than fight for the British. Baron Amherst actually remained in the service of the Crown during the war—albeit in Great Britain rather than North America—where he organized the defense against the proposed Franco-Spanish Armada of 1779. Nonetheless, his previous service in the French and Indian War meant he remained popular in New England. Amherst is also infamous for recommending, in a letter to a subordinate, the use of smallpox-covered blankets in warfare against the Native Americans along with any "other method that can serve to Extirpate this Execrable Race". For this reason, there have been occasional ad hoc movements to rename the town.

Amherst celebrated its 250th anniversary in 2009. The Amherst 250th Anniversary Celebration Committee and Amherst Historical Society organized events, including a book published by the Historical Society and written by Elizabeth M. Sharpe, Amherst A to Z.

History of town government 
The Town converted from an open town meeting to a representative town meeting form in 1938. In 1953, Amherst voters passed the "Town Manager Act", which established the office of a town manager and reduced a number of elected positions. In 1995, a charter commission was approved to study Amherst's government; the charter majority recommended a seven-person Council and a mayor, while also maintaining a reduced size representative Town Meeting (150). This proposal failed in two successive votes.

In 2001, the League of Women Voters Amherst made a number of recommendations that were adopted in 2001 in the form of a revised "Amherst Town Government Act". An effort shortly thereafter to amend the charter to eliminate the town meeting, and establish an elected mayor and a nine-member Town Council, was rejected by voters twice, first in spring 2003 by fourteen votes and again on March 29, 2005 by 252 votes.

In 2016, a charter commission was approved to study Amherst's government. A majority of commissioners proposed a charter that would establish a 13-member council with no mayor. This proposal was voted on the March 27, 2018 local ballot, and was passed by over 1,000 votes, a 58% majority. The new town council was sworn in on December 2, 2018.

Geography

The town is bordered by Hadley to the west, Sunderland and Leverett to the north, Shutesbury, Pelham, and Belchertown to the east, and Granby and South Hadley to the south. This point is located in the Mount Holyoke Range, which forms the so-called "Tofu Curtain." Amherst is nearly equidistant from Massachusetts' borders with Connecticut and Vermont.

Amherst's ZIP Code of 01002 is the second-lowest number in the continental United States after Agawam (not counting codes used for specific government buildings such as the IRS).

Climate

Amherst has a humid continental climate that under the Köppen system marginally falls into the warm-summer category (Dfb). Winters are cold and snowy, albeit daytime temperatures often remain above freezing. Under the 2012 USDA Plant Hardiness Zone system, Amherst (ZIP Code 01002) is in zone 5b; however, Amherst closely borders zone 6a, which penetrates into Massachusetts in the Connecticut River Valley, and climate change may be shifting those zones.

Demographics

As of the 2010 U.S. Census, there were 37,819 people, 9,259 households, and 4,484 families residing in the town. There were 9,711 housing units. The racial makeup of the town was 76.9% White, 5.4% Black or African American, 0.2% Native American, 10.9% Asian, 0.03% Pacific Islander, 2.4% some other race, and 4.1% from two or more races. 7.3% of the population were Hispanic or Latino of any race.

Of the 9,259 households in the town, 23.4% had children under the age of 18 living with them, 35.6% were headed by married couples living together, 16.3% had a female householder with no husband present, and 51.6% were non-families. Of all households, 27.3% were made up of individuals, and 9.7% were someone living alone who was 65 years of age or older. The average household size was 2.44 and the average family size was 2.88.

In the town, 10.0% of the population were under the age of 18, 55.7% were from 18 to 24, 13.3% were from 25 to 44, 13.6% were from 45 to 64, and 7.4% were 65 years of age or older. The median age was 21.6 years. For every 100 females, there were 95.8 males. For every 100 females age 18 and over, there were 94.7 males.

For the period 2011–2015, the estimated median annual income for a household in the town was $48,059, and the median income for a family was $96,005. Male full-time workers had a median income of $64,750 versus $39,278 for females. The per capita income for the town was $18,905. About 8.7% of families and 34.7% of the population were below the poverty line, including 18.2% of those under age 18 and 4.5% of those age 65 or over.

Of residents 25 years old or older, 41.7% have a graduate or professional degree, and only 4.9% did not graduate from high school. The largest industry is education, health, and social services, in which 51.9% of employed persons work.

These statistics given above include some but not all of the large student population, roughly 30,000 in 2010, many of whom only reside in the town part of the year. Amherst is home to thousands of part-time and full-time residents associated with the University of Massachusetts Amherst, Amherst College, and Hampshire College.

Income

Data is from the 2009–2013 American Community Survey 5-Year Estimates.

Economy
Major employers in Amherst include University of Massachusetts Amherst, Amherst College, William D. Mullins Memorial Center, Hampshire College, and Amherst-Pelham Regional School District.

Arts and culture

Points of interest
 Amherst Center Cultural District, formed in 2016, and the Amherst Business Improvement District
 Amherst Area Chamber of Commerce
 Amherst Cinema Arts Center: a local non-profit theater showing mostly arthouse and independent films
 Beneski Museum of Natural History, including the Hitchcock Ichnological Cabinet
 Emily Dickinson Museum, birthplace and lifelong residence of poet Emily Dickinson, now a museum. She is buried nearby in West Cemetery on Triangle Street.
 Eric Carle Museum of Picture Book Art
 Hitchcock Center for the Environment, an environmental education center on the grounds of Hampshire College 
 Mead Art Museum at Amherst College: 18,000 items with a particular strength in American art
 Theodore Baird Residence, designed by architect Frank Lloyd Wright
 W. E. B. Du Bois Library at the University of Massachusetts Amherst: the tallest academic library in the United States
 Yiddish Book Center

Sports
 Games were played in town during the 1996 World Junior Ice Hockey Championships.
 Amherst Regional High School's 1992–93 girls' basketball team inspired the book In These Girls, Hope is a Muscle by Madeleine Blais.
 The University of Massachusetts Amherst's Ultimate Frisbee Team was ranked first in the Division 1 Men's Ultimate league for the 2017 season.

Government

Amherst has a town council for its legislative branch and a town manager for its executive branch. The town manager is appointed by the town council.

Amherst's town council consists of ten district councilors and three councilors-at-large. Two district councilors are elected from each of five districts in Amherst. The three councilors-at-large are elected by the whole town. Each councilor serves a two-year term, except for the first council, where each member will serve a three-year term.

Amherst also has the following elected bodies:
 A five-member School Committee with two-year terms.
 A six-member library board of trustees with two-year terms.
 A single Oliver Smith Will Elector with a two-year term.

Amherst also has a five-member housing authority where three of the five members are elected by voters. Each member serves a two-year term.

State and federal representation 
In the Massachusetts Senate Amherst is in the "Hampshire, Franklin and Worcester" district, represented by Democratic State Senator Jo Comerford since January 2019. In the Massachusetts House of Representatives Amherst is in the 3rd Hampshire district, represented by Democratic State Representative Mindy Domb since January 2019.

Amherst is represented at the federal level by an all-Democratic delegation, including Senators Elizabeth Warren and Ed Markey, and by Representative Jim McGovern of the Second Congressional District of Massachusetts.

Voter registration

Voter registration data is from the state election enrollment statistics.

Politics

Like many college towns, Amherst leans heavily Democratic. In each of the presidential elections from 2012 to 2020, more than 80% of Amherst's votes went to the Democratic candidate.

In the 2020 United States Presidential Election, Democrat Joe Biden received 90.3 percent of the vote to incumbent Republican Donald Trump's 7.4 percent. In the 2000 United States Presidential Election, Amherst was one of a small number of places that delivered more votes for Green Party candidate Ralph Nader (who took 24% of the vote) than Republican candidate George W. Bush, who received just 13%.

Education

The town is part of the Amherst Regional School District along with Leverett, Pelham, and Shutesbury. Amherst has 3 elementary schools: Crocker Farm Elementary School, Fort River Elementary School, and Wildwood  Elementary School serving K–5. Students in Amherst then attend Amherst Regional Middle School for grades 6–8. High school students then attend Amherst Regional High School.

There are three tertiary institutions located in the town: the public University of Massachusetts Amherst (the flagship of the UMass system), and two private liberal arts colleges—Amherst College and Hampshire College.

Infrastructure

Transportation

Bus
The Pioneer Valley Transit Authority, funded by local governments and the Five College Consortium, provides public transportation in the area, operated by University of Massachusetts Transportation Services. Service runs well into the early morning hours on weekends when school is in session. Students attending any colleges in the Five Colleges Consortium have a fee included in their tuition bills (service fee for UMass Amherst students and student activity fees for the other colleges) for each semester that prepays their bus fares for the semester. UMass Transit buses operate via a proof-of-payment system, in which there are random inspections of student identification cards and bus passes and transfers.

Peter Pan Bus Lines provides service between Amherst and Springfield, Boston, and other locations in New England. Megabus provides service between New York City, Amherst, and Burlington, Vermont.

Rail
Amtrak rail service is available in nearby Northampton on the Vermonter service between Washington D.C. and St. Albans, Vermont. More frequent Amtrak service to New York City and Washington, D.C., is available from Union Station in Springfield.

Airports
The closest major domestic and limited international air service is available through Bradley International Airport (BDL) in Windsor Locks, Connecticut. Bradley is located approximately one hour's driving time from Amherst. Major international service is available through Logan International Airport (BOS) in Boston, 90 miles away.

General aviation service is close by, at Northampton Airport, Westover Metropolitan Airport, and Turners Falls Airport.

Police report
Since 1997, the local newspaper, the Amherst Bulletin, has published a weekly log of phone calls received by the Amherst Police Department. This police report, whose tone is deadpan and often unintentionally humorous, has been the subject of at least two books and a 2002 article in Harper's Magazine, "Gone When Police Got There". For example, an entry from the March 27, 2015 police report reads: "2:48 a.m. — An Ann Whalen Apartments resident awoke to find someone on her balcony looking into her bedroom. The woman later told police she thinks she may have been dreaming prior to calling 911."

Notable people

Historical

 Chinua Achebe (1930–2013), was a professor at the University of Massachusetts from 1972 to 1976
 Osmyn Baker (1800–1875), born in Amherst, United States Congressman and lawyer
 Ray Stannard Baker (1870–1946), newspaperman, biographer of Woodrow Wilson
 William S. Clark (1825–1886), Academician, politician, businessman; principal founder of the Massachusetts Agricultural College (now the University of Massachusetts Amherst), founder of the Sapporo Agricultural College (now the Hokkaido University)
 Mason Cook Darling (1801–1866), born in Amherst, United States Congressman from Wisconsin and first mayor of Fond du Lac, Wisconsin
 Melvil Dewey (1851–1931), devised the Dewey Decimal System while an assistant librarian at Amherst College in 1876
 Edward Dickinson (1803–1874), born in Amherst, lawyer, United States Congressman, and father of Emily Dickinson
 Emily Dickinson (1830–1886), born and lived in Amherst, one of the most prominent and celebrated American poets
 Eugene Field (1850–1895), raised in Amherst by cousin, Mary Field French; poet and humorist who wrote children's poem Wynken, Blynken, and Nod
 Robert Francis (1901–1987), poet
 Robert Frost (1874–1963), Pulitzer prize-winning poet who taught at Amherst College and retired there
 Howard Roger Garis (1873–1962), children's author who wrote the Uncle Wiggily book series
 Lilian Garis (1873–1954), author of juvenile fiction who under the pseudonym Laura Lee Hope wrote early volumes in the Bobbsey Twins series
 Edward Hitchcock (1793–1864), educator, early geologist and a founder of the science of ichnology
 Helen Hunt Jackson (1830–1885), born in Amherst, noted author best known for A Century of Dishonor and her novel Ramona
 Arthur Lithgow (1915–2004), lived and died in Amherst, noted actor, producer and director of Shakespeare plays, founder of the Great Lakes Shakespeare Festival in Ohio (today known as the Great Lakes Theatre Festival), former director of the McCarter Theatre in Princeton, NJ, father of actor John Lithgow
 Ebenezer Mattoon (1755–1843), born in North Amherst, Lieutenant in Continental Army during American Revolution, US Congressman (1801–1803).
 Paul Nitze (1907–2004), born in Amherst, diplomat who helped shape defense policy over numerous presidential administrations
 Julius Hawley Seelye (1824–1895), Amherst college professor, united States Representative (1875–1877), 5th President of Amherst College
 Harlan Fiske Stone (1872–1946), attended public schools in Amherst and Amherst College; dean of the Columbia Law School, 52nd Attorney General of the United States, and Chief Justice of the United States
 Mabel Loomis Todd (1856–1932), world traveler, edited and published the first volume of Emily Dickinson's poetry
 Noah Webster (1758–1843), Author of An American Dictionary of the English Language

Born or raised in Amherst

 Annie Baker, playwright
 Emily Dickinson, poet
 P. D. Eastman, children's author, illustrator, and screenwriter 
 Helen Palmer Geisel, children's author and first wife of Dr. Seuss
 Michael Hixon, U.S. Olympic Athlete Rio 2016, men's individual 3 meter springboard; 3 meter springboard synchro
 James D. Hornfischer, military historian and author
 James Ihedigbo, Detroit Lions defensive back
 Martin Johnson, of rock band Boys like Girls
 John Leonard, ice hockey player
 Amory Lovins, scientist and environmentalist
 Michael E. Mann, climatologist
 J Mascis, singer, guitarist and songwriter for alternative rock band Dinosaur Jr.
 Eric Mabius, star of ABC show Ugly Betty, attended Amherst schools
 Makaya McCraven, musician
 Julie McNiven, actress with recurring roles on Mad Men and Supernatural
 Ilan Mitchell-Smith, actor starring in 1985 film Weird Science, attended Amherst public schools
 Ebon Moss-Bachrach, actor with roles on The Bear and Girls, raised in Amherst and attended Amherst public schools
 Henry Addison Nelson (1820-1906), Presbyterian clergyman
 Eli Noyes, animator, film producer, director
 Gil Penchina, Former CEO of Wikia, Inc., attended the University of Massachusetts Amherst
 John Pettes, US Marshal for Vermont, born in Amherst
 Steve Porter, music producer
 Allen St. Pierre, executive director of NORML, attended public schools in Amherst and graduated from the University of Massachusetts Amherst
 Matt Reid, head baseball coach at Army
 Timothy Tau, writer and filmmaker
 Uma Thurman, Oscar-nominated actress, whose father, Robert Thurman, taught at Amherst College
 Martin M. Wattenberg, artist and computer scientist
 Zoe Weizenbaum, child actress
 Jamila Wideman (born 1975), female left-handed point guard basketball player, lawyer and activist
 Elisha Yaffe, comedian, actor, and producer
 Kevin Ziomek, American professional baseball pitcher in the Detroit Tigers organization

Live/lived in Amherst

 Gavin Andresen, Bitcoin Foundation founder and former Bitcoin contributor
 Christian Appy, author of Patriots and Working-Class War, professor at University of Massachusetts Amherst
 Christopher Benfey, author of The Great Wave, professor at Mount Holyoke College
 Holly Black, author of Tithe, Valiant, Ironside, and co-author of the Spiderwick Chronicles
 Augusten Burroughs, author of Running with Scissors
 Michelle Chamuel, singer, songwriter, producer
 Cassandra Clare, author of The Mortal Instruments and The Infernal Devices
 Arda Collins, poet and winner of the Yale Series of Younger Poets Competition
 Tony DiTerlizzi, author of The Spider and the Fly and co-author/illustrator for Spiderwick Chronicles
 Peter Elbow, compositionist and professor emeritus at the University of Massachusetts Amherst
 Joseph Ellis, historian and author of Founding Brothers
 Martín Espada, poet, professor at the University of Massachusetts and author of the 2006 The Republic of Poetry, among others
 Black Francis, singer/guitarist of the alternative rock band the Pixies, attended UMass Amherst
 Rebecca Guay, artist specializing in watercolor painting and illustration
 Norton Juster, author of The Phantom Tollbooth
 John Katzenbach, author of The Madman's Tale
 Julius Lester, author and professor at the University of Massachusetts Amherst
 Michael Lesy, author of Wisconsin Death Trip, professor at Hampshire College
 Cale Makar, professional ice hockey player for the Colorado Avalanche and former University of Massachusetts defenseman.
 Charles C. Mann (born 1955), journalist and author of 1491: New Revelations of the Americas Before Columbus and 1493: Uncovering the New World Columbus Created
 John Olver, politician who served in the US House of Representatives
 John Elder Robison, author of Look Me in the Eye; older brother of Augusten Burroughs
 Joey Santiago, lead guitarist of the alternative rock band the Pixies, attended UMass Amherst
 Archie Shepp, jazz musician and professor emeritus at the University of Massachusetts Amherst
 Chris Smither, folk/blues singer, guitarist, and songwriter
 James Tate (born 1943), poet and professor at the University of Massachusetts Amherst
 Carl Vigeland, author of In Concert and many other books
 John Edgar Wideman, novelist and writer
 Dara Wier, poet and professor in the MFA Program for Poets & Writers at the University of Massachusetts Amherst
 Roman Yakub, composer

Sister cities
 Nyeri, Kenya
 La Paz Centro, Nicaragua
 Kanegasaki, Japan

See also
 Amherst Regional High School
 Amherst-Pelham Regional School District
 Tofu Curtain

References

External links

 Town of Amherst official website
 
 Digital Amherst, an online repository of historic information about Amherst
 Town of Amherst Collection at the Amherst College Archives & Special Collections

 
Academic enclaves
Springfield metropolitan area, Massachusetts
Towns in Hampshire County, Massachusetts